The 2020 World of Westgate 200 was the 18th stock car race of the 2020 NASCAR Gander RV & Outdoors Truck Series season, the 3rd iteration of the event, and the second race of the Round of 10 in the Playoffs. The race was held on Friday, September 25, 2020, in North Las Vegas, Nevada at Las Vegas Motor Speedway, a  permanent D-shaped oval racetrack. The race took the scheduled 134 laps to complete. At race's end, Austin Hill of Hattori Racing Enterprises would take control on the final restart of the race and would held off Sheldon Creed to win the race, the 6th NASCAR Gander RV & Outdoors Truck Series win of his career and the 2nd and final win of the season. To fill out the podium, Sheldon Creed of GMS Racing and Tanner Gray of GMS Racing would finish 2nd and 3rd, respectively.

The race was the debut in the NASCAR Gander RV & Outdoors Truck Series for IndyCar driver Conor Daly.

Background 

Las Vegas Motor Speedway, located in Clark County, Nevada outside the Las Vegas city limits and about 15 miles northeast of the Las Vegas Strip, is a 1,200-acre (490 ha) complex of multiple tracks for motorsports racing. The complex is owned by Speedway Motorsports, Inc., which is headquartered in Charlotte, North Carolina.

Entry list

Starting lineup 
The starting lineup was determined by a metric qualifying system based on the fastest lap and results of the last race, the 2020 UNOH 200, and owner's points. As a result, Brett Moffitt of GMS Racing won the pole.

Race results 
Stage 1 Laps: 30

Stage 2 Laps: 30

Stage 3 Laps: 74

References 

2020 NASCAR Gander RV & Outdoors Truck Series
NASCAR races at Las Vegas Motor Speedway
September 2020 sports events in the United States
2020 in sports in Nevada